"Out with My Baby" is a song by Australian singer-songwriter Guy Sebastian. It was co-written by Sebastian and Robin Thicke, who also produced this single alongside Pro Jay. "Out with My Baby" topped the Australian Singles Chart and was accredited platinum by Australian Recording Industry Association (ARIA).

Music video
A music video was produced to promote the single. In the video, Sebastian is seen dancing and singing in an outdoors club atmosphere at night. This version of the video replaced an earlier one where Sebastian was singing in a recording studio with his fantasies being projected around him. Sony BMG eventually scrapped the concept because it portrayed Sebastian as "too pop".

Track listing
Australian CD single
 "Out with My Baby" – 3:38
 "Out with My Baby" (Clipse remix) – 4:10
 "Out with My Baby" (ATFC's Afros & Shelltoes remix) – 8:18

Charts

Weekly charts

Year-end charts

Certifications

References

2004 singles
2004 songs
Guy Sebastian songs
Number-one singles in Australia
Songs written by Guy Sebastian
Songs written by Robin Thicke
Sony BMG singles